Salpingogaster is a genus of syrphid flies in the family Syrphidae. There are at least 30 described species in Salpingogaster.

Species
These 30 species belong to the genus Salpingogaster:

S. abdominalis (Sack, 1920) c
S. bequaerti Curran, 1933 c g
S. bicolor Sack, 1920 c g
S. bipunctifrons Curran, 1934 c g
S. browni Curran, 1941 c g
S. bruneri Curran, 1932 c g
S. cochenillivorus (Guerin-Meneville, 1848) c g
S. conopida (Philippi, 1865) c g
S. cornuta Hull, 1944 c g
S. costalis (Walker, 1852) c
S. cothurnata Bigot, 1884 c g
S. diana Hull, 1943 c g
S. frontalis Sack, 1920 c g
S. gracilis Sack, 1920 c g
S. impura Curran, 1941 c g
S. limbipennis Williston, 1891 c g
S. lineata Sack, 1920 c g
S. liposeta Fluke, 1937 c g
S. minor Austen, 1893 c g
S. nepenthe (Hull, 1943) i c g
S. nigra Schiner, 1868
S. nigricauda Sack, 1920 c g
S. nova Giglio-Tos, 1892 c g
S. petiolata Hull, 1944 c g
S. punctifrons Curran, 1929 i c g b
S. pygophora Schiner, 1868
S. stigmatipennis Hull, 1940 c g
S. texana Curran, 1932 i
S. uncinata Hull, 1945 c g
S. virgata Austen, 1893 c g

Data sources: i = ITIS, c = Catalogue of Life, g = GBIF, b = Bugguide.net

References

Further reading

 
 
 

Syrphini
Articles created by Qbugbot